Nikolay Hristov (born 1 August 1989) is a Bulgarian footballer who plays as a midfielder for Levski Lom.

Career
On 27 June 2017, Hristov signed with Litex Lovech.  He left the club at the end of the 2017–18 season.

On 25 June 2018, Hristov signed with CSKA 1948.

References

External links
 
 

1989 births
Living people
Bulgarian footballers
Bulgarian expatriate footballers
FC Botev Vratsa players
FK Pelister players
FK Bregalnica Štip players
FC Lokomotiv Gorna Oryahovitsa players
PFC Litex Lovech players
FC CSKA 1948 Sofia players
PFC Spartak Pleven players
Expatriate footballers in North Macedonia
First Professional Football League (Bulgaria) players
Macedonian First Football League players
Association football midfielders